The following is a list of dams in Toyama Prefecture, Japan.

List

Notes

See also

References 

Toyama